Cándido Antonio "Chicho" Sibilio Hughes (3 October 1958 – 10 August 2019) was a Dominican-Spanish professional basketball player. He competed in the men's tournament at the 1980 Summer Olympics.

He moved to Spain in February 1976 and acquired Spanish citizenship roughly a year later, on 16 June 1977. A player for FC Barcelona Bàsquet from 1976 to 1989, Sibilio, a noted three-point shooter, won the 1981, 1983, 1987, 1988, and 1989 National League/ACB league trophies.  He later played for Tau Vitoria putting an end to his career after the conclusion of the 1992/1993 season.

He died on 10 August 2019 in a property he owned in San Gregorio de Nigua, in the southern coast of the Dominican Republic.

Notes

References

External links
 

1958 births
2019 deaths
Basketball players at the 1980 Summer Olympics
FC Barcelona Bàsquet players
Dominican Republic emigrants to Spain
Liga ACB players
Olympic basketball players of Spain
People from San Cristóbal, Dominican Republic
Saski Baskonia players
Spanish men's basketball players
Small forwards
1982 FIBA World Championship players
1986 FIBA World Championship players